

Dancethink is the first album by the Ann Arbor, Michigan-based band Ella Riot, formerly My Dear Disco. The band was active from 2007 to 2011 and released two definitive works, Dancethink LP and Love Child EP. The band had two other EPs, My Dear Disco and Over the Noise, whose tracks were re-recorded and released in final form on Dancethink and Love Child – with the exception of one track named "Over the Noise". The band also produced remix music and released a collection titled The Remixes EP. Ella Riot specialized in writing and performing live dance music. The band referred to its musical style as "DanceThink Music", dance music written to stand on its own merit and be enjoyed apart from dance. Accordingly, their first album was named Dancethink. Their music combines elements from several genres – rock, jazz, electronic, pop, soul and punk. An album review characterized the Dancethink LP as a combination of trance and rock.

Track listing

Personnel
Credits adapted from Bandcamp music store.

 My Dear Disco – writer, performer, producer
 Mark Saunders (Beat360 Studio) – co-producer
 "All I Do" – writer Stevie Wonder

References

2009 albums
Ella Riot albums